This list of winning streaks lists all articles containing lists of Winning streaks in sports.

 List of winning streaks in the Olympic Games
 List of high school boys basketball streaks by state
 List of NFL franchise post-season streaks
 List of National Hockey League longest winning streaks
 List of Major League Baseball franchise postseason streaks
 Longest NCAA Division I football winning streaks
 List of National Football League longest winning streaks
 Basketball winning streaks
 List of Major League Baseball longest winning streaks
 List of National Basketball Association longest winning streaks
 List of winning streaks in the Olympic Games
 List of longest PGA Tour win streaks
 List of Major League Baseball individual streaks

Sports records and statistics
winning streaks
winning streaks